John Fernandez or John Fernandes may refer to:

João Fernandes (explorer) (15th century), Portuguese explorer
John Fernandez (Indiana politician) (born 1953), mayor of Bloomington, Indiana from 1995 to 2003
John Fernandez (Malaysian politician) (born 1941)
John Fernandes (born 1975), American multi-instrumentalist musician
John V. Fernandes (born 1952), Massachusetts politician
John F Fernandez (active 1987–2014), Indian politician from Goa

See also
Juan Fernández (disambiguation)